John Anderson Castello (1802, British Guiana-1877, Jamaica) was a Guyanese child actor and journalist who established his reputation in Jamaica, whither he moved as a teenager. Following Master Betty, known as "the Young Roscius", Castello was called "the West Indian Roscius". He performed in Spanish Town in October 1816 at the age of thirteen. Castello remained popular with Jamaican theatre-goers until 1818, when he reached puberty and his voice broke.

Theatrical career
William Adamson, who managed his own theatre company had arrived from Barbados, produced John Home's Douglas or the Noble Shepherd and cast Castello in the role of the Young Norval. When he performed the role of Lothair in "Monk" Lewis' Adelgitha, the author – who was in the audience – complained about the performance. With the death of Adamson that year, his replacement, Mr Burnett refused to pay him the same rate as adult members of the cast and his last performance with Burnett's company took place in December 1818. In July 1919 he appeared at the Pavilion Theatre, New York in the role of Caleb Quotem in George Colman's play The Wags of Windsor. However no accounts of further theatrical performance exist until he resurfaced in Kingston Theatre, Jamaica in July 1828 where he delivered George Alexander Stevens's comic monologue The Lecture on Heads. In 1829 he joined the English Company and continued to perform in Kingston.

Journalist career
In 1836 he bought the Falmouth Post which he then published and edited as weekly newspaper up until his death in 1877.

References

1802 births
1877 deaths
19th century Guyanese actors